São Tomé and Príncipe participated at the 2018 Summer Youth Olympics in Buenos Aires, Argentina from 6 October to 18 October 2018.

Competitors

Athletics

Track and road events

Canoeing

São Tomé and Príncipe was given one boat to compete by the tripartite committee.

 Boys' C1 - 1 boat

Boys

Taekwondo 

 Girls' 63 kg

References

2018 in São Tomé and Príncipe
Nations at the 2018 Summer Youth Olympics
São Tomé and Príncipe at the Youth Olympics